Natalie du Toit OIG MBE (born 29 January 1984) is a South African swimmer. She is best known for the gold medals she won at the 2004 Paralympic Games as well as the Commonwealth Games. She was one of two Paralympians to compete at the 2008 Summer Olympics in Beijing; the other being table tennis player Natalia Partyka. Du Toit became the third amputee ever to qualify for the Olympics, where she placed 16th in the 10K, "Marathon", swim.

Early life
Du Toit was born in Cape Town, South Africa and attended Timour Hall Primary school. She began competing internationally in swimming at the age of 14. In February 2001 her left leg was amputated at the knee after she was hit by a car while riding her scooter back to school after swimming practice. She was 17 at the time. Three months later, before she had started walking again, she was back in the pool with the intention of competing in the 2002 Commonwealth Games. Du Toit swims without the aid of a prosthetic limb.

She completed her scholastic education at the Reddam House, Cape Town after which she studied for a Bachelor of Science degree at the University of Cape Town, specializing in genetics and physiology. In her free time she does motivational speaking.

Swimming career
Du Toit first competed internationally at the age of 14, when she took part in the 1998 Commonwealth Games in Kuala Lumpur. During the 2002 Commonwealth Games in Manchester, Du Toit, who was then 18 years old, won both the multi-disability 50 m freestyle and the multi-disability 100 m freestyle in world record time. She also made sporting history by qualifying for the 800 m able-bodied freestyle final – the first time that an athlete with a disability had qualified for the final of an able-bodied event. At the closing of the Manchester Commonwealth Games, she was presented with the first David Dixon Award for Outstanding Athlete of the Games.

In 2003, competing against able-bodied swimmers, Du Toit won gold in the 800 metres freestyle at the All-Africa Games as well as silver in the 800 metres freestyle and bronze in the 400 metres freestyle at the Afro-Asian Games.

She narrowly missed qualifying for the Olympics in Athens in 2004, but during the Paralympics that were held in the same city, she won one silver and five gold medals. In the same year, her courage and achievements were acknowledged with a nomination for the Laureus World Sportsperson of the Year 2004 with Disability Award. At the 2006 Commonwealth Games she repeated her previous performance by winning the same two golds as she had in Manchester. In 2006 Du Toit also won six gold medals at the fourth IPC World Swimming Championships, finishing third overall in a race which included 36 males and 20 females.

On 3 May 2008, Du Toit qualified for the 2008 Beijing Olympics after finishing fourth in the 10 km open water race at the Open Water World Championships in Seville, Spain. Her time was only 5.1 seconds off the winner in a race that made its first Olympic appearance in Beijing. At the Beijing Olympics women's 10 km race, she finished in 16th place, 1:22.2 minutes behind the winner. She also took part in the 2008 Summer Paralympics, winning five gold medals.  13 June 2008

On 27 August 2012, just three days before the start of the 2012 Summer Paralympics, she announced her intention to retire at the end of the event.

2008 Olympic and Paralympic opening ceremonies
South Africa's Olympic Committee chose Du Toit to carry their flag at the 2008 Summer Olympics opening ceremony, making her the first athlete to carry a flag in both Olympics and Paralympics in a single year.

Major sporting achievements
200 m SM9 individual medley swimming gold medal – Paralympics (2012)
100 m S9 butterfly swimming gold medal – Paralympics (2012)
400 m S9 freestyle swimming gold medal – Paralympics (2012)
100 m S9 freestyle swimming silver medal – Paralympics (2012)
100 m S9 freestyle swimming gold medal – Commonwealth Games (2010)
100 m S9 butterfly swimming gold medal – Commonwealth Games (2010)
50 m S9 freestyle swimming gold medal – Commonwealth Games (2010)
50 m S9 freestyle swimming gold medal – Paralympics (2008)
400 m S9 freestyle swimming gold medal – Paralympics (2008)
200 m SM9 individual medley swimming gold medal – Paralympics (2008)
100 m S9 freestyle swimming gold medal – Paralympics (2008)
100 m S9 butterfly swimming gold medal – Paralympics (2008)
100 m freestyle swimming EAD (multi-disability) gold – Commonwealth Games (2006)
50 m freestyle swimming EAD (multi-disability) gold – Commonwealth Games (2006)
100 m S9 backstroke swimming silver medal – Paralympics (2004)
100 m S9 butterfly swimming gold medal – Paralympics (2004)
100 m S9 freestyle swimming gold medal – Paralympics (2004)
200 m SM9 individual medley swimming gold medal – Paralympics (2004)
400 m S9 freestyle swimming gold medal – Paralympics (2004)
50 m S9 freestyle swimming gold medal – Paralympics (2004)
800 m freestyle swimming gold medal – All-Africa Games (2003)
800 m freestyle swimming silver medal – Afro-Asian Games (2003)
400 m freestyle swimming bronze medal – Afro-Asian Games (2003)
David Dixon Award for outstanding athlete – Commonwealth Games (2002)
100 m freestyle swimming EAD (multi-disability) gold – Commonwealth Games (2002)
50 m freestyle swimming EAD (multi-disability) gold – Commonwealth Games (2002)

Awards and honours

 In August 2002 she was awarded the Western Cape Golden Cross. During the award ceremony Western Cape Premier Marthinus van Schalkwyk said she had gone "beyond gold and swam her way into the hearts of not only South Africans but the whole world".
 Du Toit was voted 48th in the Top 100 Great South Africans in 2004 by the South African Broadcasting Corporation. 
 She won the Whang Youn Dai Achievement Award in 2008.
 In December 2009 she received the Order of Ikhamanga in Gold "for her exceptional achievements in swimming."
 On 10 March 2010, she was awarded the Laureus World Sportsperson of the Year with a Disability for "breaking down the barriers between disabled and able-bodied sport".
In 2013, she was made an Honorary Member of the Order of the British Empire (MBE) for services to Paralympic sport.

See also
Athletes with most gold medals in one event at the Paralympic Games
List of athletes who have competed in the Paralympics and Olympics
2008 Summer Olympics national flag bearers
List of flag bearers for South Africa at the Olympics
2008 Summer Paralympics national flag bearers
George Eyser
Olivér Halassy
Natalia Partyka

Notes

References

External links
 
 

1984 births
African Games gold medalists for South Africa
African Games medalists in swimming
Afrikaner people
Amputee category Paralympic competitors
Commonwealth Games gold medallists for South Africa
Commonwealth Games medallists in swimming
Competitors at the 2003 All-Africa Games
South African female backstroke swimmers
South African female butterfly swimmers
South African female freestyle swimmers
Female long-distance swimmers
Living people
Medalists at the 2004 Summer Paralympics
Medalists at the 2008 Summer Paralympics
Medalists at the 2012 Summer Paralympics
Olympic swimmers of South Africa
Paralympic gold medalists for South Africa
Paralympic silver medalists for South Africa
Paralympic swimmers of South Africa
Recipients of the Order of Ikhamanga
S9-classified Paralympic swimmers
South African amputees
South African female swimmers
Sportspeople from Cape Town
Swimmers at the 2002 Commonwealth Games
Swimmers at the 2004 Summer Paralympics
Swimmers at the 2006 Commonwealth Games
Swimmers at the 2008 Summer Olympics
Swimmers at the 2008 Summer Paralympics
Swimmers at the 2010 Commonwealth Games
Swimmers at the 2012 Summer Paralympics
University of Cape Town alumni
World record holders in paralympic swimming
Medalists at the World Para Swimming Championships
Paralympic medalists in swimming
Alumni of Wynberg Girls' High School
Honorary Members of the Order of the British Empire
Medallists at the 2002 Commonwealth Games
Medallists at the 2006 Commonwealth Games
Medallists at the 2010 Commonwealth Games